Kosmeč is an uninhabited islet in Croatia, part of the Elaphiti Islands archipelago off the coast of southern Dalmatia, near Dubrovnik. Its area is 0.024 km² and its coastline is 0.57 km long.

Islets of Croatia
Islands of the Adriatic Sea
Uninhabited islands of Croatia
Elaphiti Islands